William Andrews Clark Jr. (March 29, 1877 – June 14, 1934) was a Los Angeles-based philanthropist and the youngest surviving son of copper baron and U.S. Senator William Andrews Clark Sr. and his first wife, Katherine.

Early life
William Andrews Clark Jr. was born on March 29, 1877, in Deer Lodge, Montana. His father was William A. Clark and his mother was Katherine Louise Stauffer. He was educated in France and in the New York area and graduated from the University of Virginia with a bachelor's degree in law in 1899.

Career and hobbies
Clark was a partner in the law firm Clark & Roote in Butte, Montana. He also served on the boards of several of his father's mining and industrial concerns.

Book collection
In the mid-1910s, he began collecting antiquarian and fine press books as a serious hobby (he had dabbled in book buying previous to this). In 1919, he hired bibliographer Robert E. Cowan to consult on book-buying purchases and to help with the compilation of a printed library catalog. The first volume of this was printed in 1920 by San Francisco printer John Henry Nash.

Philanthropy
He founded the Los Angeles Philharmonic, which debuted in the Trinity Auditorium in 1919, and bequeathed his library of rare books and manuscripts, the William Andrews Clark Memorial Library, to the University of California, Los Angeles upon his death in 1934. He also helped to fund the construction of the Hollywood Bowl.

Personal life
In 1902, he married Mabel Duffield Foster (1880–1903), who died of sepsis following the birth of their son William Andrews Clark III ("Tertius") (1902–1932), who died in a plane crash in Arizona in 1932.

In 1907, he married Alice McManus (1883–1916), a native Nevadan, and they moved their permanent home to Los Angeles in the early 1910s (Clark County, Nevada is named for his father). Their house at Adams Boulevard and Cimarron Street occupied the grounds that the Clark Library is now located.

Clark also had romantic relationships with men. Notable among his lovers was Harrison Post, who co-transcribed Clark's collection of Oscar Wilde's letters to Lord Alfred Douglas. Clark also put Post in charge of the interior decoration of the Clark Library. According to library staff, the thirteen naked men painted on the library's ornate ceiling all have Post's face. Post lived in a mansion across from Clark's on Cimarron Street and inherited a substantial trust fund on Clark's death.

Death
He died on June 14, 1934, at Salmon Lake, Montana. He is entombed in the family mausoleum which he built on the island in Sylvan Lake at the Hollywood Forever Cemetery. Both of his wives and his son are also in the mausoleum.

References

Clark, William Andrews Jr.
Clark, William Andrews Jr.
American book and manuscript collectors
Clark Jr., William Andrews
Burials at Hollywood Forever Cemetery
People from Deer Lodge, Montana
University of Virginia alumni
People from Butte, Montana
William Andrews Jr.
American philanthropists
American LGBT businesspeople